{{Infobox Christian leader
| type             = cardinal
| honorific-prefix = His Eminence
| name             = Francis Xavier Kriengsak Kovitvanit
| honorific-suffix = 
| native_name      = ฟรังซิสเซเวียร์ เกรียงศักดิ์ โกวิทวาณิช
| native_name_lang = th
| title            = Cardinal, Archbishop of Bangkok
| image            = Card.FX.Kriengsak.jpg
| image_size       = 
| alt              = 
| caption          = Kovitvanit as cardinal
| church           = Roman Catholic Church
| archdiocese      = Bangkok
| province         = 
| metropolis       = 
| diocese          = 
| see              = Bangkok
| elected          = 
| appointed        = 14 May 2009
| term             = 
| term_start       = 16 August 2009
| quashed          = 
| term_end         = 
| predecessor      = Michael Michai Kitbunchu
| opposed          = 
| successor        = 
| other_post       = Cardinal-Priest of Santa Maria Addolorata

| ordination       = 11 July 1976
| ordained_by      = Michael Michai Kitbunchu
| consecration     = 2 June 2007
| consecrated_by   = Michael Michai Kitbunchu
| cardinal         = 14 February 2015
| created_cardinal_by = Pope Francis
| rank             = 

| birth_name       = Francis Xavier Kriengsak Kovithavanij
| birth_date       = 
| birth_place      = Bang Rak, Bangkok, Thailand
| death_date       = 
| death_place      = 
| buried           = 
| nationality      = Thai
| religion         = Roman Catholic
| residence        = 
| parents          = Joseph Piti KovitvanitTeresa Phatcharin Kovitvanit
| spouse           = 
| children         = 
| occupation       = 
| profession       = 
| previous_post    = Bishop of Nakhon Sawan (2007–2009)
| education        =
| alma_mater       = 
| motto            = "Verbum crucis virtus est"(Word of the cross is strength)(พระคำแห่งไม้กางเขนคือความแข็งแกร่ง)(Phra khả h̄æ̀ng mị̂kāngk̄hen khụ̄x khwām k̄hæ̆ngkær̀ng)
| signature        = 
| signature_alt    = 
| coat_of_arms     = Coat of arms of Francis Xavier Kriengsak Kovithavanij.svg
| coat_of_arms_alt = 

| feast_day        = 
| venerated        = 
| saint_title      = 
| beatified_date   = 
| beatified_place  = 
| beatified_by     = 
| canonized_date   = 
| canonized_place  = 
| canonized_by     = 
| attributes       = 
| patronage        = 
| shrine           = 
| suppressed_date  = 

| other            = 
}}

Francis Xavier Kriengsak Kovitvanit (born 27 May 1949) is a Thai Catholic prelate and cardinal who has served as Archbishop of Bangkok since 2009.

Biography
Born in Bangkok to ethnic Chinese parents, he entered the St Joseph's Minor Seminary in Sam Phran. From 1970 to 1976 he studied philosophy and theology at the Pontifical Urbaniana University in Rome, and was ordained as priest on 11 July 1976. He was first assigned to be assistant priest at the Nativity of Mary Church in Ban Pan, and then at the Epiphany Church Koh Yai (1977–1979). In 1979–1981 he served as vice-rector of St Joseph's Minor Seminary in Sam Phran. He went to the Gregorian University in Rome from 1982 till 1983 to specialize in spirituality.

From 1983 to 1989 he was rector of the Holy Family Intermediate Seminary in Nakhon Ratchasima, and then till 1993 under-secretary of the Catholic Bishops' Conference of Thailand, as well as rector of Lux Mundi National Major Seminary in Sam Phran since 1992. In 2000 he became parish priest at the church of Our Lady of Lourdes in Hua Take, and also since 2001 a special lecturer at Sam Phran major seminary. From 2003 until his appointment as bishop, he was parish priest of the Assumption Cathedral and secretary of the council of priests of the Archdiocese of Bangkok.

On 7 March 2007 Pope Benedict XVI appointed him as bishop of Nakhon Sawan, which had been vacant since 2005, when his predecessor Louis Chamniern Santisukniram was made Archbishop of Thare and Nonseng. He was consecrated on 2 June by Cardinal Michael Michai Kitbunchu, whose successor as Archbishop of Bangkok he became on 14 May 2009. Archbishop Kriengsak Kovitvanit was officially installed on 16 August 2009.

On 4 January 2015 it was announced that Pope Francis has appointed him a cardinal. Up to the age of 80, he will be eligible to enter a papal conclave to elect the Pope's successor. He was officially made cardinal on 14 February and at that ceremony, he was appointed Cardinal-Priest of Santa Maria Addolorata''.

In April 2015 he was appointed a member of the Congregation for the Evangelization of Peoples and of the Pontifical Council for Social Communications. He will hold these memberships until his 80th birthday.

See also
Roman Catholic Diocese of Nakhon Sawan

References

External links
 
Archdiocese of Bangkok on Kriengsak Kovitvanit (Thai)

1949 births
Living people
Kriengsak Kovitvanit
Kriengsak Kovitvanit
Kriengsak Kovitvanit
Pontifical Gregorian University alumni
Pontifical Urban University alumni
Kriengsak Kovitvanit
Kriengsak Kovitvanit
Cardinals created by Pope Francis
Members of the Congregation for the Evangelization of Peoples
Members of the Pontifical Council for Social Communications